The Premiere is a Brazilian television channel on pay-per-view broadcasts the main football State Championships in Brazil, and the Brazilian Championship Série A and Série B. Being part of Canais Globo, it is present in SKY, Claro TV and Vivo TV, and some operators outside the country, such as MEO and NOS. From 1997 to 2006 it was called Premiere Esportes, switching to Premiere Futebol Clube and then to PFC, but in 2011 moved again, this time to Premiere FC, and finally to Premiere starting in 2013.

Team sports

Narrators
Minas Gerais: Jaime Júnior and Rogério Corrêa.
Pernambuco: Rembrandt Junior 
Rio de Janeiro: Bernardo Edler, Bruno Fonseca, Claudio Uchôa, Clayton Carvalho, Daniel Pereira, Eduardo Moreno, Eusebio Resende, Gustavo Villani, Jader Rocha, Julio Oliveira, Luiz Carlos Júnior, Luiz Felipe Prota, Márcio Meneghini, Renata Silveira and Rhoodes Lima
São Paulo: Everaldo Marques, Gustavo Villani, Henrique Guidi, Jota Junior, Milton Leite, Natália Lara, Odinei Ribeiro, Sergio Arenillas and Vinicius Rodrigues

Commentators
Minas Gerais: Fábio Júnior and Henrique Fernandes
Pernambuco: Cabral Neto and Danny Morais
Rio de Janeiro: Ana Thaís Matos, André Loffredo, Carlos Eduardo Lino, Carlos Eduardo Mansur, Conrado Santana, Grafite, Júnior, Ledio Carmona, Marcelo Raed, Marcelo Rodrigues, Paulo Cesar Vasconcellos, Paulo Nunes, Pedrinho, Pedro Moreno, Renata Mendonça, Ricardo Gonzalez, Roger Flores.
Rio Grande do Sul: Diogo Olivier and Mauricio Saraiva
São Paulo: Alexandre Lozetti, Caio Ribeiro, Fabíola Andrade, Maurício Noriega, Ricardinho and Sergio Xavier Filho

Central do Apito
Fernanda Colombo
Janette Arcanjo
Paulo César de Oliveira
Sálvio Spínola Fagundes Filho
Sandro Meira Ricci

Reporters
Alagoas: Andréa Resende and Ricardo Amaral
Bahia: Camila Oliveira, Daniela Leone, Danilo Ribeiro, Eduardo Oliveira, Renan Pinheiro and Sergio Pinheiro.
Ceará: Beatriz Carvalho, Caio Ricard, Diego Twardy and Lucas Catrib.
Distrito Federal: André Barroso and Karina Azevedo.
Goiás: Karla Izumi, Rafael Sebba, Rodrigo Castro and Victor Hugo Araújo.
Maranhão: Werton Araújo
Mato Grosso: Flávio Santos
Minas Gerais: Emanoel Araújo, Guilherme Frossard, Guto Rabelo, Maria Cláudia Bonutti, Rodrigo Franco and Roger Casé.
Pará: André Laurent
Paraná: Evandro Harenza, Juliana Fontes, Nadja Mauad, Raphaela Potter and Thiago Ribeiro.
Pernambuco: Diogo Marques, Lucas de Senna, Sabrina Rocha, Sarah Porto and Victor Andrade.
Rio de Janeiro: Ana Helena Goebel, André Pessoa, Anna Flávia Nunes, Ben-Hur Correia, Débora Gares, Diego Morais, Edson Viana, Fábio Juppa, Fred Justo, Gabriela Moreira, Julia Guimarães, Juliano Lima, Karin Duarte, Kiko Menezes, Klaus Barbosa, Pedro Neville, Raphael de Angeli, Ricardo Lay, Richard Souza and Sofia Miranda
Rio Grande do Sul: Bruno Halpern, Bruno Marsilli, Eduardo Deconto, Fernando Becker, Kelly Costa, Leonardo Muller, Mateus Trindade, Maurício Gaspretto, Paula Menezes and Rodrigo Cordeiro.
Santa Catarina: Alisson Francisco, Carlos Rauen, Cristian de los Santos, Isabela Corrêa, Marcelo Siqueira and Ronaldo Fontana.
São Paulo: Aline Galdino, Amanda Barbosa, Caio Maciel, Débora Carvalho, Denise Thomaz Bastos, Edgar Alencar, Estella Gomes, Eudes Junior, Felipe Brisolla, Fernando Vidotto, Filipe Cury, Gabriela Ribeiro, Guilherme Pereira, Guilherme Roseguini, Gustavo Biano, Joanna de Assis, José Renato Ambrósio, Júlia Dotto, Lívia Laranjeira, Luiz Teixeira, Marco Aurélio Souza, Pedro Rocha, Plácido Berci and Victor LaRegina.
Sergipe: Guilherme Fraga

Championships broadcast by Premiere

Nationals 
  Brasileirão Série A (All games except those that involve Club Athletico Paranaense)
  Brasileirão Série B  
  Copa do Brasil

Regionals 
 Paulistão
 Campeonato Mineiro 
 Campeonato Gaucho
 Campeonato Pernambucano

Premiere Clubes
Premiere FC created a channel for all its subscribers, with 24 hours of football per day, Premiere Clubes. With reruns of games all day, since 1993 until today. Every person that signs the Premiere Futebol Clube automatically gets the channel Premiere Clubes.

PFC Internacional

The PFC Internacional (or Premiere Internacional) was launched in 2007. It's the first brazilian sports channel focused on international audience. Produced by Canais Globo, the channel is available in more than 33 countries (United States, Canada, Portugal, Curaçao, Mozambique, Angola, Puerto Rico, Trinidad and Tobago, France, Spain, Argentina, Paraguay, Uruguay, Chile, Bolivia, Panama, Costa Rica, Honduras, Guatemala, El Salvador, Dominican Republic, Mexico, Peru, Venezuela and Japan). According to Premiere, more than 600 Brazilian football games are broadcast live by the channel every year.

Programming

PFC Internacional's programming consists in football matches and SporTV shows. From January to May, the channel focuses in broadcasting the state championships and from May to December in broadcasting the national championship. According to Premiere, the channel airs more than 600 Brazilian football matches live every year.

When football matches are not being shown, Sportv shows like Baú do Esporte, Bem, Amigos!, Esporte Espetacular, Giro da Rodada, Globo Esporte Brasil, Grande Círculo are broadcast. Redação SporTV, Seleção SporTV, SporTV News, Tá na Área and Troca de Passes are very likely to be aired live. The channel also rely on re runs of brazilian football matches, specially at dawn.

External links
 Official Website in Portuguese
 Page PFC International in Portuguese

Television stations in Brazil
Globosat
Television channels and stations established in 1997
Sports television networks in Brazil
Association football on television